Ramtek railway station is a small railway station serving the historic city of Ramtek in the Nagpur district of Maharashtra, India.

Location 
The Ramtek station connects only with Nagpur Junction and with Itwari railway station.

References

External links 

Railway stations in Nagpur district
Nagpur SEC railway division